Jari De Busser (born 21 October 1999) is a Belgian professional footballer who plays as a goalkeeper for Belgian First Division B side Lommel.

Career
De Busser started his senior career with Lierse, making his professional debut Belgian First Division B in October 2017, in a 1–1 draw with AFC Tubize. In the summer of 2020, he joined Lommel on a free transfer from Gent.

Career statistics

Club

References

External links

1999 births
Living people
Belgian footballers
Association football goalkeepers
Challenger Pro League players
Lierse S.K. players
K.A.A. Gent players
Lommel S.K. players